Kent Hartman is a Portland, Oregon-based author. His book The Wrecking Crew: The Inside Story of Rock and Roll's Best-Kept Secret won the Frances Fuller Victor Oregon Book Award in 2013 was a Los Angeles Times bestseller.

Hartman spent decades in Los Angeles, and worked with a variety of famous recording artists. He produced a nationally syndicated radio program, The Classic Comedy Break. As of 2012 he teaches marketing at Portland State University.

The Wrecking Crew book was inspired by a conversation between the author and Larry Knechtel, a member of the band Bread, and previously a member of the Wrecking Crew, an informal group of studio musicians who played anonymously on many 1960s music hits.

References

Further reading 

Writers from Portland, Oregon
Year of birth missing (living people)
Living people
Writers from Los Angeles
Portland State University faculty